List of Powers episodes may refer to:

 List of Powers (American TV series) episodes
 List of Powers (British TV series) episodes